Thomas de Monthermer, 2nd Baron Monthermer (4 October 1301 – 24 June 1340) was the son of Ralph de Monthermer, 1st Baron Monthermer and Joan of Acre, the daughter of King Edward I of England. He was a first cousin of King Edward III of England.

Early life
Thomas was born on 4 October 1301 in Stoke, Ham, Wiltshire.

Life and family
He gained the title of Baron Monthermer on the death of his father. He married Margaret de Brewes, daughter of Sir Peter de Brewes. They had one daughter, Margaret, who in 1343 became the wife of John de Montacute, 1st Baron Montacute, the younger brother of William Montacute and son of William Montagu, 1st Earl of Salisbury. Their son John became the 3rd Earl of Salisbury and 4th Baron Monthermer.

Later life and death
In 1340 he fought in the Battle of Sluys and died on 24 June from wounds he received in action.

Ancestry

References

1301 births
1340 deaths
14th-century English nobility
Barons Monthermer
People of the Hundred Years' War
English military personnel killed in action